This is a yearly list of the women's American weightlifting champions.

Champions by year
As of 3 July 2022

Multiple champions
As of 3 July 2022

See also
 List of United States men's national weightlifting champions

References

Weightlifting
 
Women
Weight
Weightlifting
Women
Weightlifting women
National weightlifting championships